The Rover class is a British ship class of Small Fleet Tankers, active from 1970 to 2017 with the Royal Fleet Auxiliary. Two remain in service, one having been sold to Portugal and one to Indonesia; the rest have been scrapped or are awaiting disposal. They are tasked with the replenishment at sea of naval warships with fuel oils and with limited supplies of other naval stores. For RAS tasking, they can refuel a vessel on either beam and a third trailing astern and have a large flight deck to allow vertical replenishment with helicopters.

History
Tenders for what became five ships were invited in 1967. Problems with the original propulsion led to the first three of the class being re-engined in 1974. The final two had minor changes including improved accommodation and different stern anchor arrangements. Blue Rover suffered a fire during construction in 1970 which killed two shipyard workers. Costs ranged from £3m for Green Rover to £7.7m for Gold Rover, last of the class.

Ships

Gallery

References
Notes

Bibliography
 Warships of the Royal Navy, Captain John E. Moore RN, Jane's Publishing, 1979, 
 Britain's Modern Royal Navy, Paul Beaver, Patrick Stephens Limited, 1996, 

Auxiliary replenishment ship classes